Joey Lynn Lumpkin (born February 19, 1960) is a former American football linebacker that played two seasons for the Buffalo Bills. He appeared in 20 games from 1982 to 1983.

References

External links
'Summer of Legends' No. 55 Joey Lumpkin

1960 births
Living people
American football linebackers
Arizona State Sun Devils football players
Buffalo Bills players
Players of American football from Oklahoma
People from Ardmore, Oklahoma